Houstonia humifusa, commonly called matted bluet, is a plant species in the coffee family (Rubiaceae). It is native to the United States, where it is found in Texas, Oklahoma, and New Mexico. It is typically found in sandy areas, or sometimes over gypsum.

Houstonia humifusa is an herbaceous annual, growing to around 15 cm tall. It produces light pink and purple flowers in spring and early summer.

References

External links
Lady Bird Johnson Wildflower Center, Native Plant Database

H
Flora of New Mexico
Flora of Oklahoma
Flora of Texas
Taxa named by George Engelmann
Taxa named by Asa Gray
Flora without expected TNC conservation status